Chew Green is the site of the ancient Roman encampment, commonly but erroneously called Ad Fines (Latin: The Limits) on the 1885-1900 edition of the Ordnance Survey map, in Northumberland, England,  north of Rochester and  west of Alwinton. The encampment was adjacent to Dere Street, a Roman road that stretched south to York (Eboracum), and almost on the present-day border with Scotland.

Archaeological excavation at Chew Green has uncovered a complex of Roman military camps consisting of a Roman fort, two fortlets, two camps and a section of Roman road. The Roman remains were overlaid with evidence of the medieval settlement of Kemylpethe that included a small chapel, although the evidence for this latter is based on reports of an undocumented excavation in the 1880s and must be regarded as insubstantial. Evidence inside the fort indicates it was used as permanent settlement. The encampment likely served only as a military base, not a colonial settlement.

The site is within the Northumberland National Park and within the Military Training Area at Otterburn.

See also
 Bremenium
 Featherwood Roman Camps
 Quintus Lollius Urbicus
 History of Northumberland
 Barrow Burn
 Windy Gyle

External links

 Roman Britain
 Keys to the Past
 Northumberland National Park

References

Roman fortifications in England
Roman sites in Northumberland
Former populated places in Northumberland
Anglo-Scottish border
Roman fortified camps in England
Alwinton
Rochester, Northumberland